The Elberta Theatre is a historic two-story building in Brigham City, Utah. It was built with red bricks and stucco in 1917 by William R. Dredge and W.H. Shurtliffe, and it was designed in the Prairie School style. It has been listed on the National Register of Historic Places since October 17, 1991.

References

National Register of Historic Places in Box Elder County, Utah
Prairie School architecture in Utah
Theatres completed in 1917
Theatres on the National Register of Historic Places in Utah